The 1955 Washington and Lee Generals football team was an American football team that represented the Washington and Lee University as a member of the Southern Conference (SoCon) during the 1955 college football season. Led by first-year head coach Bill Chipley, the Generals compiled an overall record of 0–7 with a mark of 0–1 in conference play, placing last out of ten teams in the SoCon.

This season marked the return of Generals' football after the University trustees canceled the Generals' 1954 season after deciding to no longer provide subsidies for intercollegiate athletics.

Schedule

References

Washington and Lee
Washington and Lee Generals football seasons
College football winless seasons
Washington and Lee Generals football